Katia Rodrigues (born ) is a Brazilian female volleyball player.

She was part of the Brazil women's national volleyball team at the 2003 Pan American Games, and the 2005 FIVB World Grand Prix.

Clubs
 Rexona Ades (2005)

References

External links
 Player info CEV
 Player info FIVB

1979 births
Living people
Brazilian women's volleyball players
Place of birth missing (living people)
Middle blockers
People from Piracicaba
Sportspeople from São Paulo (state)